The Africans: A Triple Heritage is a documentary history, written and narrated by Dr. Ali Mazrui in the early 1980s and jointly produced by the BBC and the Public Broadcasting Service (WETA, Washington) in association with the Nigerian Television Authority. A book by the same title was jointly published by BBC Publications and Little, Brown and Company. The film series premiered in 1986 on BBC and controversially on local PBS stations throughout the United States.

Brief Review of the Series 
Africa's triple heritage, as envisioned by Mazrui and promoted in this documentary project, is a product resulting from three major influences: (1) an indigenous heritage borne out of time and climate change; (2) the heritage of eurocentric capitalism forced on Africans by European colonialism; and (3) the spread of Islam by both jihad and evangelism. The negative effects of this history have yet to be addressed by independent African leaders, while the West has tended to regard Africa as recipient rather than as transmitter of effects. Yet Africa has transformed both Europe and America in the past, Mazrui points out, and the difficult situation in which Africa finds itself today (economically dependent, culturally mixed, and politically unstable) is the price it has had to pay for Western development.

The series is in nine parts, including the following programs:

1. The Nature of a Continent
2. A Legacy of Lifestyles
3. New Gods
4. Tools of Exploitation
5. New Conflicts
6. In Search of Stability
7. A Garden of Eden in Decay
8. A Clash of Cultures
9. Global Africa

The companion volume to the TV series by the same name is thought-provoking for the author's frank and outspoken manner of presenting the facts as well as for the facts themselves. The book is chock full of information and unique ideas, has beautiful pictures, and should be read both by experts and laypersons.

About the creator 
Professor Ali Al'amin Mazrui was born February 24, 1933, in Mombasa, Kenya, and died October 12, 2014. During his lifetime he was a distinguished academic, a prolific scholar, and an incisive political commentator on African politics, international political culture, political Islam, and North-South relations. At his death, Mazrui was considered one of the top 100 thinkers in the world. He first rose to prominence as a critic of some of the accepted orthodoxies of African intellectuals in the 1960s and 1970s. He was critical of African socialism and Marxism, that communism was a Western import just as unsuited for the African condition as the earlier colonial attempts to install European type governments and capitalist economic principles. He argued that a revised liberalism could help the continent and described himself as a proponent of a unique ideology of African liberalism.

At the same time Mazrui was a prominent critic of the current world order. He believed the capitalist system was deeply exploitative of Africa, and that the West rarely if ever lived up to their liberal ideals. He opposed Western interventions in the developing world, such as the Iraq War. He was also long been a critic of Israeli militarism, being one of the first to try to link the treatment of Palestinians with South Africa's apartheid.

In his later years, Mazrui became a well-known commentator on Islam and Islamism. While utterly rejecting violence and terrorism, Mazrui has praised some of the anti-imperialist sentiment that plays an important role in modern Islamic fundamentalism. He also argued that Sharia law is not incompatible with democracy.

References

External links

1986 British television series debuts
1986 British television series endings
1980s British documentary television series
1980s British television miniseries
BBC television documentaries
Documentary films about Africa
English-language television shows